Christopher A. Pearson (born January 5, 1973) is a Vermont politician and a member of the Vermont Progressive Party. He served three terms in the Vermont Senate as one of 6 senators representing Chittenden County.  He previously served five terms in the Vermont House of Representatives representing the Chittenden-3-4 District (currently, the Chittenden 6-4 District) during 2006-2009 and 2011–2017.

Pearson served as Leader of the Progressive Party caucus in the Vermont House from 2007 to 2009 and 2011–2017.

After Chittenden County Progressive Senator David Zuckerman ran for Lieutenant Governor of Vermont, Pearson decided to run for Vermont Senate from Chittenden County as a fusion candidate supported by Vermont Democratic Party and Vermont Progressive Party. On May 24, 2016, Pearson was endorsed by presidential candidate U.S. Senator Bernie Sanders.  On November 8, 2016, Pearson finished sixth in an 8-candidate race for the six State Senate seats from Chittenden County. He was re-elected in 2018 and 2020 before deciding not to run in 2022.

References

External links
 Website

Living people
Members of the Vermont House of Representatives
Vermont Progressive Party politicians
1973 births
21st-century American politicians
Vermont state senators